Avraham Yoffe (born 25 October 1913, died 11 April 1983) was an Israel general during the Six-Day War. He later entered politics, and served as a member of the Knesset for Likud between 1974 and 1977.

Biography
Yoffe was born in Yavne'el in 1913, during the era when the Ottoman Empire still controlled Palestine. He was one of four children born to Chaim and Miriam Yoffe. His father was a member of the Yoffe family and in his early years, Avraham Yoffe attended the Mikveh Yisrael agricultural school.

Military career
At the age of 16 he joined the Haganah. In 1936, Yoffe had joined the Special Night Squads, a joint British-Jewish counter-insurgency unit established by Orde Charles Wingate. Yoffe served as a squad leader in one of the squads, acting as Lt. Michael Grove second in command.

During World War II he served as a captain in the British Artillery Corps from 1940 until 1944.

During the 1948 war he was a battalion commander in the Golani brigade. On 12 May his battalion captured Beisan during Operation Gideon.

During the Suez Crisis he commanded Brigade 9 of the IDF, a motorized infantry brigade which he personally led on a march into the southern Sinai to capture  Sharm el-Sheikh on 5 November 1956. Between 1957 and 1958 he headed the training department and was commander of the officers' school. In 1958 he was appointed commander of the Southern Command, and in 1962 switched to the Northern Command. After being demobilised in 1964, he was recalled to service during the Six-Day War, to command a division (ugdah in Hebrew) in the Southern Command, along the much younger Generals Israel Tal and Ariel Sharon,

“Though  fifty-three  years  old  and  paunchy, the director of Israel’s Nature Protection Society, Avraham Yoffe, was a seasoned fighter in Sinai. In 1956, he had led an infantry column down the peninsula’s eastern coast to capture Sharm al-Sheikh. Later, as head of the Southern Command, he developed contingency plans for moving tanks over desert wastes that were widely believed insurmountable. Summoned a few weeks before the war by Gen. Gavish, Yoffe had arrived at camp in civilian clothes, thinking he was making a courtesy call. He returned in a brigadier general’s uniform and took charge of the 31st Ugdah with its two reserve brigades, each with 100 tanks. His assignment was to penetrate Sinai south of Tal’s forces and north of Sharon’s, dividing the two fronts and preventing enemy reinforcements from reaching either. Then, dashing eastward, he would attack Egypt’s second line of defense while its first was still busy fighting.”

He commanded a troop division in Egypt during the attack on the Sinai Peninsula, through Wadi Haroudin, an area impassable to the Israeli tanks. His army captured the Bir-Lafhan junction, effectively preventing the Egyptian army from calling for reinforcements.

Avraham Yoffe and his four brigades on the Egyptian front avoided any areas of heavy enemy concentration and rushed to the passes; in fact, he traversed terrain that was unguarded because the Egyptians believed that tanks could not cross over dunes. Then, General Israel Tal's elite tank division and General Sharon would follow behind, forcing the Egyptians back into a deathtrap that was guaranteed to wipe out the third of their army that resided in the Sinai. The basis of the plan was for Yoffe to attack the Egyptians from the flank, and drive them to retreat into the Mitla Pass, where Sharon and Tal would wipe them out.

As was seen through the first four days of the war, when Israel and Egypt were locked in combat, this plan succeeded beyond expectations, forcing the Egyptian retreat. On the eve of the first day of fighting, after intense battles, Tal's forces reached El-Arish and Sharon's division prevailed in the most important encounter in north Sinai in the Battle of Abu-Ageila. Meanwhile, Yoffe's division advanced on the Egyptian defenses and captured the Bir-Lafhan junction. By the end of the first day, part of Tal's division headed north to the Gaza Strip, and by 7 June the IDF captured Gaza City.

On the fourth day of the war, 8 June 1967, the Egyptian forces were defeated. General Tal's division conquered Qantara on the banks of the Suez Canal and continued south along the canal in order to join up with the main force of the division which continued from Bir Gifgafa to the Suez Canal in the Ismailiya sector. South of them, General Yoffe's division also continued towards the canal along two axes in the Suez sector, while another force of his division continued on another route to Ras-Sudar on the Gulf of Suez, south of the Canal. From there, the force continued south along the Gulf of Suez and reached Abu- Zenima, where it met up with the paratroopers coming from E-Tur.

Scientific activities

General Yoffe had an important role in discovery of Bar Kokhba letter in a cave in Judaean Desert. He participated in the archaeological exploration with Yigael Yadin in a cave earlier plundered by Bedouin and researched by another archaeological team. Yoffe suggested use of advanced military equipment, which resulted in discovery of buried artifacts. That find is among the most important for study of the Bar Kokhba revolt against Romans.

In 1963, while in military duty, Avraham Yoffe was permitted to serve as a chairman of the newly created Nature Reserves Authority Council. In November 1964 he retired from the military and in May 1965 he was appointed director of the Nature Reserves Authority, where he served for 14 years, replaced by Adir Shapira in 1978.

Political career
Yoffe was one of the founders of the Movement for Greater Israel, and as the organisation merged into it, subsequently joined the Likud. He was elected to the Knesset on the Likud list in 1973, and was a member of the influential Foreign Affairs and Defense Committee and Finance Committee. During the 1977 Israeli legislative election he announced he will not run for the seat.

References

External links

1913 births
1983 deaths
Israeli generals
Jews in Mandatory Palestine
Likud politicians
Members of the 8th Knesset (1974–1977)
Movement for Greater Israel politicians
Israeli people of the Six-Day War
La'am politicians